Immokalee is an unincorporated community and census-designated place in Collier County, Florida, United States.

History

The region was settled by the Calusa people. It was inhabited by the Seminole centuries later, after they moved down from northern Florida. Initially the settlement was known as Gopher Ridge by the Seminole and Miccosukee nations. Immokalee means "your home" in the Mikasuki language.

When the swamps were drained in the region, agriculture became the dominant industry. European-American hunters, trappers, Native American traders, cowmen, and missionaries moved in before permanent villages developed. The first permanent settlement was founded in 1872. In 1921, the Atlantic Coast Line Railroad extended its Haines City Branch south to Immokalee.  The railroad was removed in 1989.

The Immokalee area is heavily agricultural. It is one of the nation's major centers of tomato growing. In 1960, CBS News anchor Edward R. Murrow reported on the region's farms' working conditions for his Harvest of Shame report for CBS Reports, which described the harsh lives of migrant workers.

Geography
Immokalee is in northern Collier County along Florida State Road 29.

Climate
The climate in Immokalee is right on the border between a humid subtropical climate and a tropical climate, with the mean temperature in the coldest month, January, at  being 0.1 degrees Fahrenheit below the  threshold for a tropical climate.

Demographics

2020 census

As of the 2020 United States census, there were 24,557 people, 5,985 households, and 4,517 families residing in the CDP.

2010 census
Immokalee's population was 24,154 at the 2010 census. It is part of the Naples–Marco Island Metropolitan Statistical Area.

2000 census
As of the census of 2000, there were 19,763 people, 4,715 households, and 3,635 families residing in the CDP. The racial makeup of the CDP was 70.98% Hispanic (Of Any race), 18.03% African American, 3.19% White, 1.03% Native American, 0.20% Asian, 0.19% Pacific Islander, 35.66% from other races, and 6.38% from two or more races.

There were 4,715 households, out of which 49.7% had children under the age of 18 living with them, 45.5% were married couples living together, 20.0% had a female householder with no husband present, and 22.9% were non-families. 13.1% of all households were made up of individuals, and 3.9% had someone living alone who was 65 years of age or older.  The average household size was 3.91 and the average family size was 4.10.

In the CDP, the population was spread out, with 34.9% under the age of 18, 15.7% from 18 to 24, 31.2% from 25 to 44, 14.1% from 45 to 64, and 4.1% who were 65 years of age or older.  The median age was 25 years. For every 100 females, there were 129.6 males.  For every 100 females age 18 and over, there were 145.9 males.

The median income for a household in the CDP was $24,315, and the median income for a family was $22,628. Males had a median income of $17,875 versus $16,713 for females. The per capita income for the CDP was $8,576.  About 34.6% of families and 39.8% of the population were below the poverty line, including 46.1% of those under age 18 and 26.9% of those age 65 or over.

Government
Being unincorporated, the area has no municipal government of its own and is governed by Collier County.

Education
Immokalee's public schools are operated by the District School Board of Collier County.

Elementary schools in Immokalee and serving Immokalee include Eden Park, Highlands, Lake Trafford, and Village Oaks. Pinecrest Elementary School, outside of and adjacent to the CDP, serves a portion of the CDP. All residents are zoned to Immokalee Middle School and Immokalee High School, both in the CDP.

Transportation

Public transport 
Collier Area Transit provides local bus service and paratransit. The #5 connects to Naples, the #7 connects to Marco Island (limited trips), and the 8A circulates within the area.

Railroads 
Immokalee used to be served by the Seaboard Coast Line Railroad (formerly Atlantic Coast Line), which ran a branchline from Palmdale through Immokalee to Everglades City. The line generated considerable agricultural-related traffic. The line was cut back to Sunniland south of Immokalee in the 1950s and then abandoned to the mainline at Palmdale in the 1980s. This left Immokalee without rail service.

Roads 
The main road through Immokalee is State Road 29. Other important county roads through the region are CR 29A and CR 846.

Airports 
The closest airport for commercial service is Southwest Florida International Airport.

Landmarks and institutions
The federally recognized Seminole Tribe of Florida has one of its six reservations here, Immokalee Reservation, on which it operates one of its gaming casinos.

The Audubon Society's Corkscrew Swamp Sanctuary is nearby.

Media
Immokalee is home to WCIW-LP, a low power community radio station owned and operated by the Coalition of Immokalee Workers. The station was built by volunteers from Immokalee and around the country in December 2003 at the fifth Prometheus Radio Project barnraising. WCIW broadcasts music, news, and public affairs to listeners in Spanish, Haitian Creole and several indigenous languages.

WAFZ-FM (92.1 FM) is a full-power FM radio station licensed to Immokalee, Florida. The station plays a variety of hits in the Regional Mexican format. In the 1980s, WAFZ also played Tejano music on its sister station WAFZ-AM. In its beginnings WAFZ was WZOR-AM 1490 and played English-language adult contemporary music and news in the morning and until 3pm. Then it changed its format to Regional Mexican/Tejano. The early DJs who worked there were Gabino Soliz, "EL CHAVO ALEGRE", and Irma Ayala. The station continued on the air until the mid-1990s, when it went silent until what is now WAFZ was bought by Glades Media Company LLC, and transmitted simultaneously what WAFZ-FM was playing (a regional Mexican format). The current format of WAFZ is a young Regional Mexican, playing newer top 40 hits of the genre.

WAFZ's programming is also heard on WAFZ AM 1490 in Immokalee.

Notable people
 D'Ernest Johnson, Cleveland Browns running back
Mackensie Alexander, Cincinnati Bengals cornerback
 Albert Bentley, played football at Immokalee High School and went on to play for the Miami Hurricanes and the Indianapolis Colts
 J. C. Jackson, New England Patriots cornerback
 Edgerrin James, Hall of Fame running back (Indianapolis Colts)
 Javarris James, Indianapolis Colts running back
 Brian Rolle, Philadelphia Eagles linebacker
 Ovince Saint Preux, Ultimate Fighting Championship competitor
 Felipe Santos, missing person
 Deadrin Senat, Atlanta Falcons defensive tackle

See also
 Coalition of Immokalee Workers, a grassroots community and workers' organization in the area. The 2014 documentary Food Chains was shot in Immokalee.

References

External links

 The Story of Immokalee 1938 WPA interview covering founding, slave era, post-Civil War Reconstruction and up through Great Depression.  Electronic record maintained by Library of Congress.  Accessed January 15, 2007.

Census-designated places in Collier County, Florida
Seminole Tribe of Florida
Census-designated places in Florida
List of place names of Choctaw origin in the United States